Raczyński's Note, dated December 10, 1942, and signed by Minister of Foreign Affairs Edward Raczyński, was the official diplomatic note from the government of Poland in exile regarding the extermination of the Jews in German-occupied Poland. Sent to the foreign ministers of the Allies, it was the first official report on the Holocaust to inform the Western public about these crimes. It identified Treblinka, Bełżec and Sobibór by name as extermination camps. It was also the first official speech of one of the governments of Nazi-occupied Europe in defense of all Jews persecuted by Germany – not only citizens of their country.

History

The note was written by Polish diplomat, Edward Raczyński, Minister of Foreign Affairs of the Polish Exile Government in London, based on documents transported in the form of microfilm (materials prepared by the Jewish Affairs Department of the Polish Home Army Headquarters) to London by courier Jan Karski and confirmed by his certificate, and his own reports prepared in 1940–1942. Raczyński's note, dated December 10, 1942, was sent to the governments of the signatory countries of the United Nations Declaration. It was personally addressed to other foreign ministers.

On behalf of the Polish government, Raczyński informed the governments of all Allied countries about the desperate situation of Jews in the German-occupied Poland and the unfolding genocide being carried out by the Germans, and called for help.

Contents

The note was typed on nine pages. In 21 points it presented a description of the background of the problem and the current situation of Jews in occupied Poland, a chronological description of the information campaign of the Polish government on this area, and a call for allied governments to stop the crime. The note was sent to the foreign ministers of the 26 governments that signed the Declaration by United Nations in 1942. Below is the note sent to Anthony Eden on 10 December 1942:

See also
The Black Book of Poland
Karski's reports
The Polish White Book
Witold's Report

References

Bibliography

External links
75th Anniversary of "Raczyński's Note". The full content of the brochure in PDF format: The Mass Extermination of Jews in German Occupied Poland.
The Mass Extermination of Jews in German Occupied Poland (PDF), Polish Ministry of Foreign Affairs.

Government reports
1942 documents
1942 in England
Holocaust historiography
Holocaust historical documents
International response to the Holocaust
The Holocaust in Poland